The following is a list of non-sports trading cards collections released among hundreds of card sets. The list includes different types that are or have been available, including animals, comics, television series, motor vehicles and movies, among others:

Alternative (Alt) Trading Cards 

 G.A.S. Series 1 (G.A.S. Trading Cards, 2021)
 G.A.S. Series 2 (G.A.S. Trading Cards, 2022)
 NFT IRL (G.A.S. Trading Cards, 2021-22)
 G.A.S. Moments (G.A.S. Trading Cards, 2021-22)
 Shock Drops (G.A.S. Trading Cards, 2022)
 Heavy Series 1 (Heavy Trading Cards, 2022) 
 Heavy Series 2 (Heavy Trading Cards, 2022)
 Singularity (Heavy Trading Cards, 2022)
 Trash Panda Bootlegs (Trash Panda Cards, 2022)
 Fill The Void Bootlegs (Fill The Void Bootlegs, 2022)
 Paper Chase Series 1 (Paper Chase Card Co., 2022)
 Paper Chase Series 2 (Paper Chase Card Co., 2022)
 All Base (All Base Trading Cards, 2022)
 Toast Trading Cards (Toast Trading Cards, 2022)
 Assassination Set (Hoosier Embalmer, 2022)

Cars and other vehicles 

 Auto Rally (Edito-Service, 1978) 
 Corvette Heritage Collection 1953–1996 (Collect-a-Card, 1996)
 Harley-Davidson (Collect-a-Card, 1992)
 Muscle Cars (Collect-a-Card, 1992) 
 Orange County Choppers (JoyRide, 2004)

Comic books and fictional characters 

 Avengers: Silver Age (Rittenhouse, 2015) 
 Avengers Assemble! (Upper Deck)
 The Ackermonster's Cardiacards! (Raygen, 1991)
 Advanced Dungeons & Dragons (TSR)
 Amalgam Comics (Fleer)
 Avengelyne (Maximum Press/WildStorm, 1996)
 Batman: The Legend (Cryptozoic, 2013)
 Batman Archives (Rittenhouse, 2008)
 Chris Achilleos (FPG)
 DC Comics (Impel, SkyBox, Topps, Upper Deck, Rittenhouse)
 DC Comics Epic Battles (Cryptozoic, 2014)
 DC Bombshells Series 1–3 (Cryptozoic, 2017–19)
 DC Cosmic Cards: Inaugural Edition (Impel, 1994)
 DC Cosmic Teams (SkyBox, 1993)
 DC's The New 52 (Cryptozoic, 2012)
 DC's The Women of Legend (Cryptozoic, 2013)
 Deadpool (Upper Deck, 2018)
 Disney Princess: Born to Explore (Panini, 2019)
 Donald Duck: 85 Years (Panini, 2019)
 Doomsday: The Death of Superman (SkyBox, 1992)
 Fantastic Four Archives (Rittenhouse, 2008)
 Joe Jusko's Edgar Rice Burroughs Collection  (FPG, 1994)
 Justice League (Cryptozoic, 2016)
 Justice League of America Archives (Rittenhouse, 2009)
 Kingdom Come Xtra (SkyBox, 1996)
 Marvel Annual 2018–19 (Upper Deck)
 Marvel Comics 70th Anniversary (Rittenhouse, 2010)
 Marvel Masterpieces  (SkyBox, 1992)
 Marvel Motion  (SkyBox, 1996)
 Flair Marvel  (Upper Deck, 2019)
 Marvel Premier (Upper Deck, 2019)
 Marvel Studios: The First 10 Years (Topps)
 Marvel Universe Series 1–3 (Impel, 1990–92)
 Mickey Mouse: 90 Years (Panini)
 Plasm Zero Issue (The River Group, 1993)
 The Punisher Season 1 (Upper Deck, 2020)
 Red Sonja (Breygent Marketing, 2011)
 The Sandman (SkyBox, 1994)
 The Savage Sword of Conan (Comic Images, 1988)
 Spider-Man 
 Spider-Man: McFarlane Series I–II (Comic Images, 1989–90) 
 Spider-Man Team-Up (Comic Images, 1990) 
 Spider-Man McFarlane Era (Comic Images, 1992) 
 Spider-Man II 30th Anniversary (Comic Images, 1992) 
 The Amazing Spider-Man (Impel, 1992); (Rittenhouse, 2012) 
 The Amazing Spider-Man (Fleer, 1994) 
 Ultra Spider-Man (Fleer, 1995, 1997) 
 Spider-Man Premium: Eternal Evil (Fleer/SkyBox, 1996) 
 Spider-Man FilmCardz (ArtBox, 2002) 
 Spider-Man (Topps, 2002) 
 Spider-Man Archives (Rittenhouse, 2009) 
 Superman: The Legend (Cryptozoic, 2013)
Tarzan 100th Anniversary (Cryptozoic, 2012)
The Uncanny X-Men (Impel, 1992) 
 The Walking Dead Comic Book (Cryptozoic, 2013)
 The Women of Legend (Cryptozoic, 2013)
 X-Men (SkyBox, 1993)
 X-Men Ultra (Fleer, 1994)

Games

Historic events 

 Actors and Actresses (Allen & Ginter, c. 1890)
 AIDS Awareness (Eclipse, 1993)
 Aircraft (Godfrey Phillips, 1934)
 Airplane Spotter Playing Cards – World War II (U.S. Games Systems, Inc., 1990)
 Americana (Donruss, 2008)
 American Heritage (Topps, 2008–09)
 American Heritage: Heroes Edition (Topps, 2009)
 Americana Beyond the Moon: NASA's Continuing Mission (Donruss, 2008)
 American Pie (Topps, 2011)
 American Pride (Inkworks, 2001)
 Art of H. G. Wells: The Time Machine, Island of Dr. Moreau, War of the Worlds (Monsterwax, 2005)
 Art Treasures of the Vatican Library (Keepsake Collectibles, 1997) 
 President Obama (Topps, 2008)
 Civil War News  (Topps, 1962) 
 Desert Storm  (Pro Set, 1991)
 Don't Let It Happen Here  (Monsterwax, 2003) 
 Famous Minors (Godfrey Phillips, 1936)
 Film Favorites  (Godfrey Phillips, 1934)
 Green Beret (Philadelphia, 1966)
 Johnson vs. Goldwater  (Topps, 1964) 
 Military Propaganda & Posters Series 1 (Cult-Stuff, 2012)
 Man on the Moon (Topps, 1969)
 NASA Space Missions (J2, 2020) 
 Princess Diana: Queen of Hearts (Trading Cards International, 1997)
 Railway Engines (Godfrey Phillips, 1934)
 Romance of the Heavens (W.D. & H.O. Wills, 1927)
 Second Sino-Japanese War (Gum, 1938) 
 Supersisters  (Supersisters, Inc., 1972)
 Titanic Commemorative Card Set (Cult-Stuff, 2012)
 Types of British Soldiers (Godfrey Phillips, 1900)
 U.S. Presidents (J2, 2020) 
 World War II (Philadelphia Gum, 1965)

Humor 

 Atomic Laugh Bombs (Exhibit Supply Co., 1948)
 Crazy Cards (Topps, 1961)
 Famous Monsters (Rosan Printing Co., 1963)
 Frankenstein Stickers (Topps, 1966)
 Funny Monsters (Topps, 1959)
 Garbage Pail Kids (Topps, 1985)
 GrossOut (Upper Deck/Kryptyx, 2006)
 Hollywood Zombies (Topps, 2007)
 Horror Monster (Nu-Cards Inc., 1961)
 Mad Magazine Series 1 (Lime Rock, 1992)
 Meanie Babies (Comic Images, 1998)
 Mad (Fleer, 1983)
 Make Your Own Name (Topps, 1966)
 National Lampoon (21st Century Archives, 1993)
 Nasty Tricks (Confex/Fun Stuff, 1990)
 Nutty Initials (Topps, 1967)
 Odd Rods (Donruss, 1969) 
 Silly Supermarket Stickers (Top Shelf Enterprises, 2003)
 Spoofy Tunes (Butthedz, 1993)
 Stupid Smiles (Topps, 1983)
 Terror Tales (1967)
 Toxic High (Topps, 1992)
 Ugly Stickers (Topps, 1965)
 Wacky Packages (Topps, 1967–present)
 Weird Wheels (Topps, 1980)
 You'll Die Laughing (Bubbles/Topps, 1959)

Merchandising and toys 

 Anheuser-Busch (Ertl, 1996)
 Barbie, 36 Years of (Tempo Marketing, 1996)
 Barbie (Futera, 2000) 
 Beanie Babies (Ty/Cyrk, 1998)
 California Raisins World Tour (Zoot, 1988)
 Campbell Soup Collection (Collect-a-Card, 1995)
 Coca-Cola Collection (Collect-a-Card, 1994)
 Coors (Coors Brewing, 1995)
 Craftsman Tools 1992 (Sears, Roebuck & Co., 1992)
 Classic Toys (That's Entertainment, 1993)
 G.I. Joe Action Cards (Hasbro/Milton Bradley, 1986)
 Hot Wheels Collector Cards (Comic Images, 1999)
 LOL Surprise (Panini, 2018)
 McDonald's Collectible Cards (Classic/McDonald's, 1996)
 Norfin Trolls (Collect-a-Card, 1993)
 Pepsi-Cola Premium Cards (Dart FlipCards, 1996)
 Santa Claus: A Nostalgic Art Collection (21st Century Archives, 1994)
 Suckadelic Suckpax (Sucklord, 2011)

Movies 

 Ace Ventura: When Nature Calls (Donruss, 1995)
 Asterix: The Secret of the Magic Potion (Panini, 2019)
 The Addams Family (Topps, 1991)
 Akira (Cornerstone, 1994)
 Disney's Aladdin (SkyBox, 1993)
 Alien (Topps, 1979)
 Alien Nation (FTCC, 1990)
 Alien vs Predator (Inkworks, 2007)
 Avengers: Age of Ultron (Upper Deck, 2015)
 Avengers: Infinity War (Upper Deck, 2018)
 Avengers: Endgame (Panini, 2019)
 Back to the Future II (Topps)
 Batman (1989) (Topps, 1989)
 Batman Returns (O-Pee-Chee, 1992)
 Batman & Robin (Fleer, 1997)
 Batman Begins (Topps, 2005)
 Beauty and the Beast (Panini)
 Cars 3 (Panini)
 Casper (Fleer, 1995)
 The Cat in the Hat (Comic Images, 2003)
 Chicken Run (Futera, 2000) 
 Chucky (Fright-Rags, 2018) 
 Close Encounters of the Third Kind (Topps, 1978)
 Coco (Panini)
 Congo (Upper Deck, 1995)
 Dinosaurs Attack! (Topps, 1988)
 Dragonheart (Topps, 1996)
 Dragons (Panini, 2017)
 Ender's Game (Cryptozoic, 2014) 
 E.T. the Extra-Terrestrial (O-Pee-Chee, 1982)
 Fievel Goes West (Impel, 1991)
 Frozen (Topps, 2013)
 Ghostbusters II (Topps, 1989)
 Ghostbusters (2016) (Cryptozoic, 2016)
 Harry Potter (Artbox, 2005–06)
 High School Musical (Topps, 2006)  
 High School Musical 2 (Topps, 2007)
 High School Musical 3 (Topps, 2008)
 The Hobbit: An Unexpected Journey (Cryptozoic, 2014) 
 The Hobbit: The Desolation of Smaug (Cryptozoic, 2015) 
 The Hobbit: The Battle of the Five Armies (Cryptozoic, 2016) 
 Hook (Topps, 1992)
 James Bond: Goldfinger (Philadelphia Gum, 1965)
 James Bond: Thunderball (Philadelphia Gum, 1966)
 James Bond: Moonraker (Topps, 1979)
 Jurassic World: Fallen Kingdom (Panini)
 Justice League (Panini, 2017)
 The Karate Kid (Topps, 1984)
 The Lion King (SkyBox, 1994), (Panini, 201?)
 The Little Mermaid (Pro Set, 1989)
 Madagascar 3 (Panini, 2008)
 Mars Attacks (Topps, 1962) (artwork by Norm Saunders)
 Monsters, Inc. (Topps, 2001)
 Night of the Living Dead (Rosem, 1987); (Imagine Inc, 1988, 1990, 1993); (Image Ten, 2009, 2012, 2013); (Unstoppable, 2012); (Fantasm Media, 2018); (Fright-Rags, 2020)
 Pacific Rim (Cryptozoic, 2014)  
 Planet of the Apes (Topps, 1969); (Inkworks, 1999)
 Rambo: First Blood Part II (Topps, 1985)
 RoboCop 2 (Topps, 1990)
 The Rocketeer (Topps, 1992)
 Rocky (Topps, 1979)
 Rocky IV (Topps, 1985)
 Screen Goddesses (Futera, 1999) 
 Small Soldiers (Inkworks, 1998)
 Space Jam (Upper Deck, 1996–97) 
 Spider-Man 2 (Upper Deck, 2004)
 Spider-Man 3 (Rittenhouse, 2007)
 Spider-Man: Far From Home (Panini, 2019)
 Superman (1978) (Topps, 1978)
 Superman Returns (Topps, 2006)
 Star Trek (Topps, 1973); (FTCC, 1984–87); (Skybox, 1994); (Rittenhouse, –2017)
 Star Wars (O-Pee-Chee, 1977) (Topps, 1977–2017)
 The Empire Strikes Back (O-Pee-Chee, 1980)
 Return of the Jedi (O-Pee-Chee, 1983) 
 Terminator 2: Judgment Day (Topps, 1991) (Impel, 1991)
 Toy Story (SkyBox, 1995)
 Toy Story 4 (Panini, 2019)
 Turma da Mônica: Laços (Panini, 2019)
 WiFi Ralph (Panini)
 Who Framed Roger Rabbit (Topps, 1988)

Music artists 

 Bay City Rollers (Topps/Trebor, 1975)
 Beatles: Black & White 1st Series (Topps, 1964) 
 Christina Aguilera (Upper Deck, 2000) 
 Justin Bieber (Panini, 2010)
 Duran Duran (Topps, 1985)
 Elvis Presley (Bubble Gums, 1956); (Donruss, 1978); (Monty Gum, 1978); (Chu Bops, 1981); (River Cards, 1992); (Press Pass, 2006, 2007)
 Freddie and the Dreamers (Donruss, 1965)
 KISS (Donruss, 1978); (Dynamite, 2018) 
 Michael Jackson: The King of Pop (Leaf, 2011) 
 Northwest Rock Trading Cards (Vince Gipson Photography, 1993)
 Ozzy Osbourne (Monowise Limited/Neca, 2001)
 Rock Stars (Donruss, 1979); (Wonder Bread, 1985)
 Rolling Stones (Whosontour Entertainment, 2007)
 Superstars MusicCards [U.K. edition] (Pro Set, 1991–92)
 Spice Girls: World Official Photo Cards (Magic Box Int., 1997)
 Yo! MTV Raps (Pro Set, 1991)
 Classic Rock, series 1–9 (J2, 2018)
 New Wave Series (J2, 2019)
 Classic R&B and Soul Series (J2, 2020)

Nature and animals 

 Animals (Premiere/Oak, 1960)
 Animals (Godfrey Phillips, 1930)
 Animals of the World (Topps, 1951)
 Animals on Safari (Boomerang Book Club, 1993)
 Animaux à sauver French version of "Wildlife in Danger" (Panini, 1992)
 Awesome Animals (Club Pro Set, 1993)
 Birds (Oak Manufacturing, 1958)
 Birds of America (Allen & Ginter, c. 1890)
 Birds of the Tropics (Allen & Ginter, c. 1890)
 Birds & Flowers of the States (Bon Air, 1991)
 Challenge of the Yukon: Dog Cards (Quaker Oats, 1950)
 Discovery Cards: Insects & Spiders V.1 (Curious Discoveries, Inc., 1996)
 Discovery Cards: Reptiles & Amphibians V.1 (Curious Discoveries, Inc., 1996)
 Discovery Cards: Sea Life V.1 (Curious Discoveries, Inc., 1996)
 Discovery Cards: Zoo Animals V.1 (Curious Discoveries, Inc., 1996)
 Dogs (Allen & Ginter, c. 1890)
 Dogs (Godfrey Phillips, 1935)
 National Parks Collection (Jefferson National Expansion Historical Assoc., 1995) 
 Wild Animals of the World (Allen & Ginter, c. 1890)

TV series 

 A-Team (Topps, 1983)
 Abbott and Costello (DuoCards, 1996)
 AAAHH!! Real Monsters (Fleer, 1995)
 Addams Family (Donruss, 1964)
 ALF (Topps, 1987)
 Alphas (Cryptozoic, 2013) 
 Alias (Inkworks, 2002)
 American Bandstand (Collect-a-Card, 1993)
 American Chopper (JoyRide, 2004)
 American Idol (Fleer, 2004); (Upper Deck, 2009) 
 Animaux (Panini, 2019)
 Andy Griffith Show (Pacific, 1991)
 Angel (Inkworks, 1999)
 Archer Seasons 1-4 (Cryptozoic 2014)
 Arrow (Cryptozoic, 2015)
 Babylon 5 (Rittenhouse, 1995/1996) (Skybox, 1999)
 Batman (Topps, 1966) 
 Battlestar Galactica (1978) (Topps, 1978); (Dart, 1996)
 Battlestar Galactica (2004) (Rittenhouse, 2006)
 Baywatch (Sports Time, 1995)
 Beverly Hillbillies (Topps, 1963); (Eclipse, 1993) 
 Big Bang Theory Seasons 1-7 (Cryptozoic, 2012–16)
 Bill Nye the Science Guy (SkyBox, 1995)
 Bionic Woman (Donruss, 1976)
 Brady Bunch (Topps, 1971)
 Branson on Stage  (NAC, 1992)
 Breaking Bad Seasons 1-5 (Cryptozoic, 2014)
 Buck Rogers (1979) (Topps, 1979)
 Buffy The Vampire Slayer (Inkworks, 1999)
 Captain Scarlet (2005) (Cards Inc., 2001–02)
 Castle Seasons 1-4  (Cryptozoic, 2013–14) 
 Charlie's Angels (Topps, 1977); (O-Pee-Chee, 1977)
 CHiPs (Donruss, 1979) 
 Daktari (Philadelphia Gum, 1966–67)
 Dallas (Donruss, 1981)
 Dinosaurs (Pro Set, 1992)
 Dragon Ball (Panini, 2018)
 The Dukes of Hazzard (Donruss, 1980)
 Doctor Who (Topps, 2015) 
 Downton Abbey Seasons 1-2 (Cryptozoic, 2014)
 Elena of Avalor (Panini)
 The Flash (Cryptozoic, 2016)
 Flintstones (Dynamic Toy, 1962) 
 Flintstones NFL (Cardz, 1993)
 Return of the Flintstones (Cardz, 1994) 
 Fringe, Seasons 1-5 (Cryptozoic, 2012–16)
 Gilligan's Island (Topps, 1965) 
 Gravity Falls (Panini)
 As Aventuras de Poliana (Panini)
 Gotham Seasons 1-2 (Cryptozoic, 2016–17) 
 Green Hornet (Donruss, 1966) 
 Guild Seasons 1-3 (Cryptozoic, 2011) 
 Happy Days (O-Pee-Chee, 1976) 
 Hogan's Heroes (Fleer, 1965) 
 Incredible Hulk (Topps, 1979) 
 Kojak (Monty Gum, 1975)
 Legends of Tomorrow Series 1–2 (Cryptozoic, 2018)
 Lost in Space (Topps, 1965)
 Magnum, P.I. (Donruss, 1982)
 Man from U.N.C.L.E. (Topps, 1965) 
 Mod Squad (Topps, 1966)
 Monkees (1966)
 Miraculous (Panini)
 Misfits (Pop Culture Company, 2012)
 Mork & Mindy (Topps, 1978)
 Once Upon a Time (Cryptozoic, 2014)
 Orphan Black Seasons 1-3 (Cryptozoic, 2016–17)  
 Outer Limits (Topps, 1964) 
 Outlander Seasons 1-2 (Cryptozoic, 2019) 
 PAW Patrol (Panini, 2018)
 Penny Dreadful (Cryptozoic, 2015)
 Pink Panther (Monty Gum)
 Psych Seasons 1-8 (2013–15)
 Red Dwarf (Futera, 2002) 
 Revenge (Cryptozoic, 2013) 
 Rick and Morty Season 1–3 (Cryptozoic, 2018)
 Simpsons (Topps, 1990)
 Sleepy Hollow (Cryptozoic, 2015)
 Smallville (Inkworks, 2002); (Cryptozoic, 2012)
 Sons of Anarchy Seasons 1-7 (Cryptozoic, 2014–15) 
 Soy Luna (Panini)
 Star Wars: The Clone Wars (Topps)
 Star Trek Original (1966) (Leaf, 1967); (Topps, 1976); (Impel, 1992) ; (SkyBox, 1999); (Rittenhouse, 2009)
 Star Trek Next Generation (1987) (Impel, 1992); (SkyBox, 1995); (Rittenhouse, 2010)
 Star Trek Deep Space Nine (1993) (SkyBox, 1993)
 Star Trek Voyager (1995) (SkyBox, 1998); (Rittenhouse, 2015)
 Star Trek Enterprise (2001) (Rittenhouse, 2002)
 Superman (Topps, 1965)
 Stargate SG-1 (Rittenhouse, 2001)
 Stargate Atlantis (Rittenhouse, 2005)
 Stargate Universe (Rittenhouse, 2009)
 Stranger Things (Topps, 2018) 
 Supergirl (Cryptozoic, 2018)
 Superman (Topps, 1966) 
 Supernatural (Inkworks, 2007); (Cryptozoic, 2014–16)
 Teenage Mutant Ninja Turtles (1987) (Topps, 1989)
 Teenage Mutant Ninja Turtles (2003) (Fleer, 2003)
 Three Stooges (Fleer, 1959); (Fleer, 1966); DuoCards (1997)
 ThunderCats (Bandai, 2012) 
 Vampirina (Panini)
 Vampire Diaries Seasons 1–4 (Cryptozoic, 2012–16) 
 Violetta (Panini)
 The Walking Dead Seasons 1–4 (2011–16)
 Welcome Back, Kotter (Topps, 1976)
 Winx Club (Panini, 2004)
 X-Files (Topps, 1995) ; (Inkworks, 2001) ; (Rittenhouse, 2018) 
 X-Files Connections (Inkworks, 2005); 
 Xena: Warrior Princess (Topps, 1998); (Rittenhouse, 2004)

Video games 
 Fortnite, Series 1 (Panini, 2019)
 Clash Royale (Topps, 2018)

See also 
 Non-sports trading card
 Collectible card game
 Digital collectible card game
 List of digital collectible card games

Notes

References

External links 

 CardCast podcast for non-sports collectors
 Cryptozoic Entertainment
 Cult-Stuff
 FPG Universe
 Jeff Allender's House of Checklists
 Non-Sport Update Magazine
 Panini Group
 Scifi Hobbie
 SketchCards.com
 Star Trek Cards
 Upper Deck
 Wizards of the Coast
 The Wrapper Magazine

Trading cards
Lists of games